Ballyhaunis railway station serves the town of Ballyhaunis in County Mayo, Ireland.

The station is on the Dublin to Westport Rail service. Passengers to or from Galway travel to Athlone and change trains. Passengers to or from Ballina and Foxford travel to Manulla Junction and change trains.

History
The station opened on 1 October 1861 (although some sources list 9 September 1861) and its 150th anniversary was celebrated in 2011 by a Ballyhaunis Railway Station-themed edition of the local annual Annagh Magazine.

Passenger traffic through the station increased notably in the form of pilgrims following the claim in 1879 that there had been an apparition of the Blessed Virgin Mary, Saint Joseph, Saint John the Evangelist and Jesus Christ (as the Lamb of God) in the nearby town of Knock.

See also
 List of railway stations in Ireland

References

External links
Ballyhaunis station Irish Rail
Ballyhaunis Railways Station 150th anniversary YouTube

Iarnród Éireann stations in County Mayo
Railway stations in County Mayo
Railway stations opened in 1861
1861 establishments in Ireland
Railway stations in the Republic of Ireland opened in the 19th century